"One 2.3 Four" is a song by French DJ and record producer Martin Solveig. The song was released in France as a digital download on 22 December 2008. It was released as the third single from his third studio album C'est la Vie (2008). The song was written and produced by Martin Solveig.

Track listing

Charts

Release history

References

2009 songs
Martin Solveig songs
Songs written by Martin Solveig